Andriy Melnyk may refer to:

 Andriy Atanasovych Melnyk (1890–1964), Ukrainian military and political leader, member of the Organization of Ukrainian Nationalists
 Andriy Anatoliyovych Melnyk, president of the Handball Federation of Ukraine
 Andriy Yaroslavovych Melnyk (born 1975), Ukrainian ambassador